The 2013 Men's Asian Individual Squash Championships is the men's edition of the 2013 Asian Individual Squash Championships, which serves as the individual Asian championship for squash players. The event took place in Islamabad in Pakistan from 1 to 5 May 2013. Aamir Atlas Khan won his first Asian Individual Championships title, defeating Abdullah Al Muzayen in the final.

Seeds

Draw and results

See also
2013 Women's Asian Individual Squash Championships
Asian Individual Squash Championships

References

External links
Asian Individual Squash Championships 2013 SquashSite website

2013 in squash
Squash in Asia
Squash tournaments in Pakistan
2013 in Pakistani sport
International sports competitions hosted by Pakistan